Lala Dicko (born 21 June 1991) is a Malian international footballer who plays as a midfielder for the Mali women's national football team. She competed for Mali at the 2018 Africa Women Cup of Nations, playing in four matches.

References

1991 births
Living people
Malian women's footballers
Mali women's international footballers
Women's association football midfielders
21st-century Malian people